David Muir Buchanan (9 March 1878 – 15 April 1950) was a Scottish professional football right half who played in the Football League for Clapton Orient. After his retirement as a player, he managed in England, Scotland and Wales.

Career statistics

Player

Manager

References

1878 births
Scottish footballers
Footballers from Bellshill
Brentford F.C. players
English Football League players
Association football wing halves
Third Lanark A.C. players
1950 deaths
Bellshill Athletic F.C. players
Middlesbrough F.C. players
Southern Football League players
Plymouth Argyle F.C. players
Leyton Orient F.C. players
Leyton F.C. players
Leyton F.C. managers
Merthyr Town F.C. managers
Hamilton Academical F.C. managers
Southern Football League managers
English Football League managers
Scottish football managers
Scottish Football League managers
Charlton Athletic F.C. non-playing staff